Carlos Núñez may refer to:

Carlos Núñez Cortés (born 1942), Argentine humorist, pianist, composer and chemist
Carlos Núñez Muñoz (born 1971), Galician musician
Carlos Núñez Téllez, Nicaraguan politician
Carlos Núñez (footballer) (born 1992), Uruguayan footballer

See also
Carlos Nunes (born 1914), former Portuguese footballer
Juan Carlos Núñez (born 1983), Mexican footballer